The following lists events that happened during 1918 in South Africa.

Incumbents
 Monarch: King George V.
 Governor-General and High Commissioner for Southern Africa: The Viscount Buxton.
 Prime Minister: Louis Botha.
 Chief Justice: James Rose Innes

Events
 An estimated 500,000 people die in the 1918 flu pandemic in South Africa, the fifth hardest hit country in the world.

January
 8 – The Koöperatiewe Wijnbouwers Vereniging van Zuid-Afrika (KWV) is founded in Paarl.

April
 2 – Victoria College becomes the Stellenbosch University.

May
 14 – The Three Minute Pause, initiated by the daily firing of the Noon Gun on Signal Hill, is instituted by Cape Town Mayor Sir Harry Hands.

June
 4 – RMS Kenilworth Castle, one of the Union-Castle Line steamships, collides with her escort destroyer HMS Rival while trying to avoid her other escort, the cruiser HMS Kent.
 5 – The Afrikaner Broederbond, a confidential cultural organisation, is founded in Johannesburg.

November
 14 – German East African troops are informed of the armistice on 11 November.
 25 – General Paul von Lettow-Vorbeck, commander of German forces in the German East Africa campaign, signs a ceasefire at Abercorn in Northern Rhodesia.

Births
 21 January – Frederick Guy Butler, poet, academic and writer. (d. 2001)
 1 July – Ahmed Deedat, Sunni Muslim missionary. (d. 2005)
 13 July – Larry Taylor, actor. (d. 2003)
 16 July – John (Jack) Frost, Second World War fighter pilot. (d. MIA 1942)
 18 July – Nelson Mandela, activist and President of South Africa. (d. 2013)

Deaths
 5 December – Schalk Willem Burger, Boer officer, lawyer, politician and statesman. (b. 1852)

Railways

Railway lines opened

 2 February – Cape – Kootjieskolk to Calvinia, .
 16 September – Cape – Kootjieskolk to Sakrivier, .

Locomotives
 Three new Cape gauge locomotive types enter service on the South African Railways (SAR):
 The first batch of twenty  4-8-2 Mountain type locomotives.
 The first of thirty Class 15B 4-8-2 Mountain type locomotives.
 Eight Class MJ1 branchline 2-6-6-0 Mallet articulated compound steam locomotives.

References

South Africa
Years in South Africa
History of South Africa